Policarpio Ortega is a Filipino windsurfer. He competed in the Windglider event at the 1984 Summer Olympics.

References

External links
 
 

Year of birth missing (living people)
Living people
Filipino windsurfers
Filipino male sailors (sport)
Olympic sailors of the Philippines
Sailors at the 1984 Summer Olympics – Windglider
Asian Games silver medalists for the Philippines
Asian Games medalists in sailing
Sailors at the 1982 Asian Games
Medalists at the 1982 Asian Games
Place of birth missing (living people)